Ketchchimalai Mosque, also known as Ketchimalai Dharga, is located on a headland overlooking the port of Beruwala, on the southwest coast of Sri Lanka. It is one of the oldest mosques in the country. 

According to local folklore, the mosque is built at the spot where the first Muslim Arab traders landed and subsequently settled in the area. It is believed that a vessel carrying seven members of the royal family of Hadhramaut, Yemen came ashore at this location. They included the Sultan Ashraff Waliullah, his five brothers and a sister. When Waliullah died in 1024 AD he was buried in a tomb on the hill. Allegedly one day, when the chief of the Masjid Al-Abrar in Beruwala was cleaning the tomb he stepped on a sharp thorn following which he rest under a tree and fell asleep. During his slumber, Waliullah appeared as a vision and sought that a mosque be built where his tomb was. Many locals mistakenly still think that Waliullah built the mosque.

At that time the site was known as “Utchchamalai” in Tamil, which translates to “high hill”, over time this was modified to its current name of Ketchchimalai.

The current building was constructed in 1911 by a wealthy Muslim businessman. It is essentially a squarish white building, with an ornate arched exterior, curving dutch-style gables, with an unusual domed minaret crowned with a crescent-and-star ornament. Outside the mosque but within its grounds are the graves of two imams (father and son) and a madrasa.

The mosque is the focus for a major Eid al-Fitr festival held at the end of Ramadan, with large numbers of pilgrims attending.

On 12 June 2015 the mosque was declared a protected archaeological site by the government.

See also
 List of mosques in Sri Lanka

References

External links 
 Ketchimala Masjid website

Mosques in Sri Lanka
Religious buildings and structures in Kalutara District
Archaeological protected monuments in Kalutara District